The 1938 NFL Championship Game was the sixth championship game played in the National Football League (NFL). It was played on December 11 at the Polo Grounds in New York City, with an attendance of 48,120, a record crowd for a title game.
 
The game matched the New York Giants (8–2–1), champions of the Eastern Division, against the Western Division champion Green Bay Packers (8–3–0). The Giants had won the regular season game with Green Bay 15–3 at the Polo Grounds three weeks earlier on November 20, but Green Bay was without hall of fame end Don Hutson; there was no clear favorite for the title game.

This was the Giants' fourth championship game appearance, their previous victory was in the famous "Sneakers game" of 1934 and they were runners-up in 1933 and 1935. It was the Packers' second trip, winning in 1936. New York also won the 1927 NFL title when the championship was awarded to the team with the best season record. Green Bay had similarly won three straight league titles in 1929, 1930, and 1931.

At halftime, Packers head coach Curly Lambeau accidentally made a wrong turn going to the team's locker room and walked out of the Polo Grounds, locking himself out. Hurrying to the front gate, Lambeau tried to get back into the Grounds, but the guards at the gate believed Lambeau was a random fan and refused him entry. As Lambeau loudly protested, a couple of sportswriters inside heard the commotion, and identified Lambeau: the guards allowed him back in, by which time halftime was nearly over.

After trailing by two points at halftime, Green Bay took the lead in the third quarter with a short field goal, but New York responded with a touchdown and held on through a scoreless fourth quarter to win, 23–17.

With the victory, the Giants became the first team to win two Championship Games since the league was split into two divisions in 1933. The two teams met again in the Championship Game the following year in Milwaukee, Wisconsin, with the Packers winning 27-0. Ed Danowski became the first Giants starting quarterback to win two NFL Championships for the team (the other is Eli Manning).

The Giants' next title was in 1956, and was won at Yankee Stadium.

Scoring summary
Sunday, December 11, 1938
Kickoff: 2 p.m. EST

First quarter
NYG – FG Ward Cuff 14, 3–0 NYG
NYG – Leemans 6 run (Johnny Gildea kick failed), 9–0 NYG
Second quarter
GB – Carl Mulleneaux 40 pass from Arnie Herber (Tiny Engebretsen kick), 9–7 NYG
NYG – Barnard 21 pass from Ed Danowski (Cuff kick), 16–7 NYG
GB – Clarke Hinkle 1 run (Engebretsen kick), 16–14 NYG
Third quarter
GB – FG Engebretsen 15, 17–16 GB
NYG – Hank Soar 23 pass from Danowski (Cuff kick), 23–17 NYG
Fourth quarter
no scoring

Officials
Referee: Bobby Cahn
Umpire: Tom Thorp
Head Linesman: Larry Conover
Field Judge: L.C. Meyer 

Players' shares
The victory earned each winning Giant player $504 and each Packer $368.

References

Green Bay Packers postseason
New York Giants postseason
Championship
1938 NFL Championship Game
Sports in Manhattan
American football competitions in New York City
NFL Championship Game
NFL Championship Game
1930s in Manhattan
Washington Heights, Manhattan